Unrivaled: Earnhardt vs. Gordon is a 2019 documentary television film about the on-track rivalry and off-track relationship between NASCAR drivers Dale Earnhardt and Jeff Gordon.

Cast

Interviewees
Jeff Gordon, No. 24 driver, also executive producer 
Dale Earnhardt Jr., Earnhardt's son and NASCAR driver, also executive producer 
Rick Hendrick, No. 24 owner 
Ray Evernham, No. 24 crew chief 
Richard Childress, No. 3 owner 
Larry McReynolds, No. 3 crew chief from 1997-1998  
Jay Wells, Earnhardt's friend 
JR Rhodes, Earnhardt's PR director 
Don Hawk, Earnhardt's business manager 
Daniel Ricciardo, Earnhardt fan and Formula 1 driver 
Ricky Craven, Gordon's teammate and NASCAR driver 
John Bickford, Gordon's stepfather 
Carol Bickford, Gordon's mother 
Joe Garner, Gordon biographer 
Jerry Punch, ESPN broadcaster
Ryan McGee, ESPN writer and reporter 
Marty Smith, ESPN writer and reporter 
Kyle Busch, Gordon fan and NASCAR driver 
Austin Dillon, Earnhardt fan and NASCAR driver 
Mike Helton, President of NASCAR 
Brian Williams, Earnhardt fan and NBC anchor 
Gavin Kilduff
Chocolate Myers, No. 3 pit crew member 
Andy Petree, No. 3 crew chief from 1993-1995 
Chris Williams, Earnhardt's friend

Uncredited 
Dale Earnhardt, No. 3 driver (archive footage)
Buck Baker (archive footage)
Rusty Wallace (archive footage)

Production
The scene where Gordon pays tribute to Earnhardt was filmed on location at Dale Earnhardt Plaza in Kannapolis, North Carolina.

Release
In the United States, the documentary premiered on Fox Sports 1 on February 14, 2019, immediately after the running of the Gander RV Duels.

Reception
In an interview with Fox Sports, Dale Earnhardt Jr. commented that the film told the story "just the way it was" and that he appreciated Gordon's tribute to his father: "It was real, you know? It was real."

According to Nielsen Media Research, Unrivaled earned 854,000 viewers during its premiere, making it FS1's most-watched original film debut.

References

2019 documentary films
American documentary television films
American auto racing films
Dale Earnhardt
Documentary films about auto racing
Documentary films about men
Documentary films about sportspeople
Films shot in North Carolina
Fox Sports 1 original programming
Jeff Gordon
NASCAR on television
2019 films
2010s American films